The Mine Smart Ferry is a transportation service in Thailand operated by Energy Absolute on the Chao Phraya River. Launched in 2021, the battery-powered Smart Ferry provides service between Bangkok and Nonthaburi.

Smart ferry operates three services, the City Line (Sathorn Pier-Phra Pinklao Pier), Metro Line (Sathorn Pier-Rama VII Pier), and the rush-hour Urban Line (Sathorn Pier-Phra Nang Klao Pier).

Pier

References 

Chao Phraya River
Water transport in Bangkok
Ferry companies of Thailand

Water taxis
Transport in Bangkok